Norbert Dietrich (24 January 1931 – 5 July 2003) was a German gymnast. He competed in eight events at the 1952 Summer Olympics, representing Saar.

See also
 Saar at the 1952 Summer Olympics

References

External links
 

1931 births
2003 deaths
German male artistic gymnasts
Olympic gymnasts of Saar
Gymnasts at the 1952 Summer Olympics
People from Friedrichsthal
Sportspeople from Saarland
20th-century German people